Manga de Clavo was one of the most famous properties and preferred hacienda of Antonio López de Santa Anna, a historic site from the first half of the nineteenth century where he lived and made decisions that defined Mexican politics of its time, serving effectively as presidential residence and government house until it was burned and partially destroyed by the invading United States Army during the Mexican–American War in 1847–1848.

History 

Santa Anna acquired the hacienda of Manga de Clavo in 1825 shortly before marrying María Inés de la Paz García his first wife, daughter of wealthy Spanish parents from Alvarado (Veracruz). During the years in which his influence grew in the region of Veracruz—occupying different positions, including the presidency of the Republic on six occasions, between 1833 and 1855—he enlarged it in size and beauty. His estate not only maintained a privileged strategic location but also of military, political and commercial importance. The economic production of Santa Anna's properties, which included multiple villages dedicated to livestock, served the entire area between Veracruz and Jalapa, placed just at the fork of major roads leading to Mexico City, either by the Royal Highway to Jalapa or the one going to Orizaba.

Also, in the lands of Manga de Clavo is where General Santa Anna's left leg was first buried, lost after being severely wounded by the French during the Pastry War, at the Veracruz dock gateway on December 5, 1838. The limb remained at his hacienda before it was transferred to the cemetery of Santa Paula in Mexico City, on the anniversary of the achievement of Mexican Independence, September 27, 1842.

For Santa Anna this was a place of rest, pleasure and entertainment, suitable for intrigue and conspiracy, as well as refuge in adversity and defeat. Countless times he took the road to Manga de Clavo from the capital withdrawing from the responsibility of governing, abandoning presidential power to retreat to the tranquility of his domain.

Amongst the most prominent foreigners who visited Manga de Clavo is the Marquise Calderón de la Barca, wife of Angel Calderon de la Barca, minister plenipotentiary of Spain in Mexico from 1839 to 1842. In her book "Life in Mexico", Calderón gives an account of the journey made from Veracruz to Manga de Clavo and the reception she had from Santa Anna and his family, this being one of the few examples and most famous description that exists of the hacienda:

Although the importance of this site began to decline due to Santa Anna's frequent absences, María Inés' death in 1844 and the 1847–1858 invasion of the United States marked the beginning of its downfall. After the uprisings that began with the Plan of Ayutla revolution, forcing Santa Anna into definitive exile in 1855, some of his properties were confiscated, most of the land was sold and soon Manga de Clavo was lost to landscape and memory.

Subsequently, some indications prove that the hacienda survived to the last decade of the nineteenth century, before the Mexican Revolution and the execution of its agricultural policies that ceased large estates and extensive lands, divided and reduced in many cases only to its main enclosure or manor house. Therefore, it can be inferred that between the years of 1920 and 1940 Manga de Clavo's process of disappearance of the accelerated becoming a ruin, consuming itself until being buried in the national unconscious.

Location 
In the early twentieth century, the remains of Manga de Clavo gave birth to the town of Vargas which grew irregularly around the hacienda, appropriating stone and obliterating signs of its true trace, thus the mansion and adjacent outbuildings were gradually destroyed to the point that only ruins could be found at ground level, virtually ceasing to exist.

This circumstance has led to the spreading of misleading information about the original and exact location of the property, erroneously expressed by enthusiastic chroniclers of the subject-matter and local townspeople in the region, but also found in history books, archives, web pages, social media sites and even TV shows. Manga de Clavo is still being confused with other properties of Santa Anna: the hacienda of El Lencero in the outskirts of Jalapa, and the remnants of a residence and barracks in the vicinity of Puente Nacional, very close to the historic Puente Nacional bridge.

The site where the estate of Manga de Clavo currently stands is located in the town of Vargas, 19 miles from the port of Veracruz in the municipality and state of the same name. Only a few foundations, scattered stones and a well survive, remains that Roberto Williams Garcia—prominent academic researcher of cultural Veracruz—was able to visit in 1967:

References

Bibliography 
Calderón de la Barca, Francis Erskine, La vida en México durante una residencia de dos años en ese país, Ed. Porrúa, México, 2003.
Fernández de Castro, Hugo, Manga de Clavo. La hacienda perdida de Santa Anna, México, 2014.
Fowler, Will, Santa Anna of Mexico, University of Nebraska Press, 2007.
González Pedrero, Enrique, País de un solo hombre: el México de Santa Anna, FCE, México, 2003 (2 t.).
Muñoz, Rafael F., Santa Anna. El dictador resplandeciente, FCE, México, 1983.
Williams García, Roberto, “Manga de Clavo”, en La palabra y el hombre, núm. 44, October–December 1967, pp. 759–762.

Mexican–American War
Ruins in Mexico
Buildings and structures completed in the 19th century
Veracruz